MOBB was a South Korean hip hop sub-unit formed by YG Entertainment in 2016. The duo consisted of label-mates Mino from Winner and Bobby from iKon.

History 
MOBB made their debut with the release of the four-track EP The Mobb. The music video for Bobby's solo single, "꽐라 (HOLUP!)" was released on September 7, 2016, and the music video for Mino's solo track "몸 (BODY)" was released on September 8. On September 9, music videos for the collaborative singles "붐벼 (FULL HOUSE)" and "빨리 전화해 (HIT ME)" were released.

Discography

Extended plays

Singles

Music videos

Awards and nominations

References 

YG Entertainment artists
South Korean hip hop groups
South Korean musical duos
South Korean boy bands